The Face Vietnam season 3 is the third season of a Vietnamese modeling-themed reality television series. It is based on the US television series The Face, and part of the international The Face franchise. After two seasons of The Face Vietnam produced by Cat Tien Sa, the show was acquired by Multimedia JSC and was modified from the broadcast channel to the panel of mentors and host. Supermodel Võ Hoàng Yến, singer and actress Minh Hằng, and supermodel Thanh Hằng became mentors, while former Vietnam's Next Top Model judge Nam Trung served as host. The third season premiered on 30 September 2018 on VTV9.

Male and female contestants competed. Team Thanh Hằng's Mạc Trung Kiên, a male contestant from Hải Dương, won the final round on December 30, 2018.

Contestants
(ages stated are at start of filming)

Episodes

Episode 1
First aired 30 September 2018

In this casting episode, "The Face" series extended the range of contestants. Both men and women could become "The Face Vietnam". Contestants face two challenges: a 'Catwalk whilst hiding their faces in a hat' and 'taking a group photo showing their true beauty with two or three models'. The four mentors appear in the introduction video. The judges for Vietnam's Next Top Model: Thanh Hằng and show host Nam Trung with new mentor Võ Hoàng Yến. Minh Hằng (replacing Hồ Ngọc Hà after the controversy surrounding her in season 2). After three months of casting, thirty-five models passed to the pick-team round. The mentors' personalities were revealed in the pick-team ring. Hoàng Yến was cast as an evil girl, in contrast to Minh Hang who was sweet. Thanh Hằng seems a calm and decisive leader. Fifteen models enter the common house.

Team Võ Hoàng Yến:  Brian Trần Đắc Lộc "Brian Trần", Tôn Thọ Tuấn Kiệt, Trần Tuyết Như, Nguyễn Quỳnh Anh, Nguyễn Huy Quang
Team Thanh Hằng:  Mạc Trung Kiên, Bùi Linh Chi, Hồ Thu Anh, Nguyễn Phạm Minh Đức "Mid Nguyễn", Nguyễn Thị Lệ Nam
Team Minh Hằng:  Hoàng Như Mỹ, Trương Thanh Long, Lê Thị Trâm Anh, Bella H'Đơk, Nguyễn Xuân Phúc

Episode 2
First aired 14 October 2018

In this episode, the 15 models faced a mini-challenge from host Nam Trung, who have to run to dispute the rooms. Later, they meet Minh Hang at the master class about spoken skills inspired by the speech. Long was a convincing victor.
 Mentor master class: Minh Hằng
 Winning master class: Trương Thanh Long

The models have to make a video with black-and-white articles of clothing in this challenge's main theme "The Golden Has Returned". Three mentors are in extreme conflict. Mrs. Thiên Hương - who represented Her World magazine, chose team Thanh Hằng. Hoàng Yên nominated Quang to get into the darkroom to go face to face with his ex-mentor, because Hoàng Yến thought Minh Hằng would be sent Mỹ or Bella. Thanh Long is chosen, not both of them. Quang has to leave the competition. Hoàng Yến was loud with Thanh Hằng and she declared a war.

 Winning coach and team:  Thanh Hằng
 Bottom two: Nguyễn Huy Quang & Trương Thanh Long
 Eliminated: Nguyễn Huy Quang
 Special guest: Trấn Thành, Thanh Duy, Trần Nguyễn Thiên Hương

Episode 3
First aired 21 October 2018

14 contestants moved to CITIGYM and they had a lesson in body liberation with music under Hoàng Yến's guidance. They learned 3 dancing styles: Hip-hop, Strong by Zumba, and Sexy dance. Như, Phúc and Mid balanced the score of the teams. Kiệt won the final victory for team Hoàng Yến.

 Mentor master class:  Võ Hoàng Yến
 Winning master class:  Tôn Thọ Tuấn Kiệt

They took part in a promotion video for CITIGYM. Hoàng Yến was defeated with the weakest performance by her contestants. Thảo Quân chose team Minh Hằng to win, while the other two teams showed a disapproving attitude because Thảo Quân  used to be the representative for this brand. In the black room, Brian and Kiên landed in the bottom two. Minh Hằng organized a dancing challenge. She gave Kiên a chance to change in upcoming challenges. Hoàng Yến was not unexpected, she would like to change her name to "The Bè Lũ"!

 Winning coach and team:  Minh Hằng
 Bottom two: Brian Trần Đắc Lộc & Mạc Trung Kiên
 Eliminated: Brian Trần Đắc Lộc
 Special guest: Jacinda, Nguyễn Thảo Quân

Episode 4
First aired 28 October 2018

13 contestants were taken to Vietnam's shopping center - ROBINS. They wore Mix-and-Match with different outfits by mentor Thanh Hằng. At the challenge, one member of each team has to choose a style such as: Street style, Sporty, Office, Rock and Glamour. Only team Hoàng Yến has fewer contestants among three teams, so Hoàng Yến's models will do more time. Như is criticized for her disrespectful attitude by the judges. Phúc, Mỹ and Kiên, Chi added one point for team Minh Hằng and Thanh Hằng. Nam received the final victory

 Mentor master class:  Thanh Hằng
 Winning master class:  Nguyễn Thị Lệ Nam "Nam Anh"

Three teams have to take part in a video for MAC Cosmetics on a turning table tagged in a sidestep with the camera hung in the air. The video requires them to use their dancing skills, without speaking. After two weeks, Hoàng Yến suddenly won the first victory. She entered the elimination room and landed with the bottom two contestants: Chi and Phúc. Phúc is contestant who had to leave the competition. Chi stayed with her mentor.

 Winning coach and team:  Võ Hoàng Yến
 Bottom two:  Bùi Linh Chi & Nguyễn Xuân Phúc
 Eliminated:  Nguyễn Xuân Phúc
 Special guest:  Hà Đỗ, Abigail Baniqued, Adam Lâm

Episode 5
First aired 4 November 2018

Minh Hằng once again held a master class on acting skills. She taught about eye contact. At this challenge, the models have to pose covering their eyes in an artificial forest. Chi won and landed in the low at before elimination
Mentor master class:  Minh Hằng
 Winning master class:  Bùi Linh Chi

12 contestants

 Winning coach and team:  Võ Hoàng Yến
 Bottom two:  Nguyễn Phạm Minh Đức & Hoàng Như Mỹ
 Eliminated:  Nguyễn Phạm Minh Đức

Episode 6
First aired: 11 November 2018

 Mentor master class:  Võ Hoàng Yến
 Winning master class:   Team Minh Hằng
 Winning coach and team:  Thanh Hằng
 Bottom two: Trần Tuyết Như & Bella H'Đơk
 Eliminated: Trần Tuyết Như
 Special guest: Trần Uyên Phương

Episode 7
First aired 18 November 2018

 Mentor master class:  Minh Hằng
 Winning master class:  Nguyễn Quỳnh Anh
 Winning coach and team:  Minh Hằng
 Bottom two: Tôn Thọ Tuấn Kiệt & Mạc Trung Kiên
 Eliminated: None
 Special guest: Hirofumi Shiramatsu

Episode 8
First aired 25 November 2018
 Mentor master class:  Thanh Hằng
 Winning master class:  Hồ Thu Anh
 Winning coach and team:  Minh Hằng
 Bottom two: Tôn Thọ Tuấn Kiệt & Hồ Thu Anh
 Eliminated: Hồ Thu Anh
 Special guest: Gael Hornebeck

Episode 9
First aired 2 December 2018
 Mentor master class:  Võ Hoàng Yến
 Winning master class:  Trương Thanh Long
 Winning coach and team:  Võ Hoàng Yến
 Bottom two: Lê Thị Trâm Anh & Nguyễn Thị Lệ Nam
 Eliminated: Nguyễn Thị Lệ Nam
 Special guest: Trần Nguyễn Thiên Hương

Episode 10
First aired 9 December 2018
 Winning master class:  Team Minh Hằng
 Winning coach and team:  Thanh Hằng
 Bottom two:  Tôn Thọ Tuấn Kiệt & Hoàng Như Mỹ
 Eliminated:  Hoàng Như Mỹ
 Special guest: Kirk McDonald Park

Episode 11
First aired 16 December 2018
 Winning master class:  Bùi Linh Chi
 Winning coach and team:   Võ Hoàng Yến
 Bottom two:  Mạc Trung Kiên & Bella H'Đơk
 Eliminated:  Bella H'Đơk
 Special guest: Stefan Reicherstorfer, Trần Uyên Phương

Episode 12
First aired: 23 December 2018
 Winning master class:  Nguyễn Quỳnh Anh
 Winning coach and team:   Minh Hằng 
 Eliminated:  Trương Thanh Long, Tôn Thọ Tuấn Kiệt & Bùi Linh Chi
 Special guest: Trang Lê, Nadav Eschar, Galit Gutman, Doron Lebovich, Keren Naftali

Episode 13: Final Walk Live
First aired 30 December 2018
 Final three: Nguyễn Quỳnh Anh, Lê Thị Trâm Anh & Mạc Trung Kiên
 Special guests: Trang Lê, Nguyễn Công Trí
 Musical performances: Minh Hằng, Chi Pu
 The Face Vietnam: Mạc Trung Kiên
 Winning coach and team: Thanh Hằng

Summaries

Elimination table

 The contestant was part of the winning team for the episode.
 The contestant was at risk of elimination.
 The contestant was eliminated from the competition.
 The contestant withdrew from the competition.
 The contestant was a runner-up.
 The contestant won The Face Vietnam 2018.

 In episode 7, team Minh Hằng won the campaign. Võ Hoàng Yến nominated Tuấn Kiệt while Thanh Hằng nominated Trung Kiên for elimination. Minh Hằng did not eliminate either of them.
 In episode 12, team Minh Hằng won the campaign but still can choose only one contestant to send to the Final Walk. Team Minh Hằng's win only means that they will be given the middle position on stage in the Final Walk.

Campaigns

Episode 1: Casting.
Episode 2: One Shot Video Theme: "The Golden Age Has Returned".
Episode 3: CITYGYM One Shot Video.
Episode 4: MAC Viral Clip.
Episode 5: Rohto's "Because The Eyes Are Priceless" Poster.
Episode 6: Macchiato Milk Tea One Shot Video.
Episode 7: Rohto's Products Viral Clip.
Episode 8: ROBINS - Central Group's Brands TVC.
Episode 9: Herworld's Fashion Video.
Episode 10: ALMA Resort TVC & Poster.
Episode 11: Macchiato Milk Tea TVC.
Episode 12: Israel Viral Clip.
Episode 13: Final Walk.

References 

2018 Vietnamese television seasons
Vietnam, 3